Dance Love Pop is the third studio album by Swedish singer Agnes, released originally on 29 October 2008 in Sweden. This was Agnes' first studio album since 2006 and her comeback to the music stage. The album is written and produced by Swedish songwriter Anders Hansson and geared towards the dance and club genre. When released the first single "On and On" it immediately showed a clear change of artistic direction for her music. This was clearly observed by the critics who all homaged her new musical style. In Sweden, a deluxe edition of the album titled Dance Love Pop: The Love Love Love Edition was released, featuring the original 10 tracks plus new song "Love Love Love", of which Agnes competed with in the Swedish drafts for Eurovision Song Contest 2009 in Moscow. The deluxe edition also included remixes and music videos of the album's singles and re-entered the official Swedish Top 60 Album Chart peaking at number 12. A re-release of the album was also made in France, where the "Edition Collector" was released on 18 January 2010 and peaked at forty-seven.

The album originally peaked at five in Sweden and the deluxe edition at twelve. In France it stayed on the charts for twenty-nine weeks and peaked at thirty-eight in the physical chart and forty-three on the digital chart. In Germany, Austria and Switzerland, the album was released by Warner Music and it peaked at sixty-eight in Germany, at seventy in Austria and at forty-five in Switzerland. In the UK it peaked at 13 on the Dance Chart.

Background and development
The name of the album was first revealed on 13 September 2008 on Swedish radio show "Tracks", the host, Kaj Kindvall declared that the name would be Dance! Love! Pop!. The spelling with exclamation marks after each words was later dispatch by the label Roxy Recordings and changed to merely "Dance Love Pop". The album was described as follow: "it covers the three things that the music is all about [...];Christmas music that has a twist of pop and is about love".

With this album, Agnes together with her producer and fellow songwriter geared towards the dance and club genre. Agnes recalls when Hansson's name first came up for the album: "They said maybe you should just meet first and see if you like each other, as opposed to just working together." They got on – so well that Hansson ended up producing an album that helped Agnes realize her vision, Dance Love and Pop together in one album She added, "A lot of things changed for me when I started to work with this album. I really liked it, because I knew that I wanted to do something totally different to the two others. I wanted to do uptempo, disco-orientated songs and I really wanted to work with Anders because he felt the same way."

For the international release of the album, some of the songs were remastered and remixed. The second UK single, "I Need You Now", was entirely re-recorded for its release. For the German market, a new song called "You Rain" was recorded and "Big Blue Wall" was remixed. Agnes is also due to record a couple of new songs for the US release of the album. A few new tracks have been added for the international release, "You Rain", "Secret Love" and "If I Could Build My Whole World Around You". For the francophone market the French version of "Release Me", called "Réalise" was also included. Just like "I Need You Now", another ballad called "Big Blue Wall" has been re-recorded in to a dance-music version called "the Moonwalker version" and is featured on the album as well as the original version from the Swedish release which is renamed "the Piano version".

Chart performance
The album entered the Swedish official chart on 6 November 2008 just a few days after it was released on October 28. It entered at five and that was also its peak, the following weeks it started to fall and left the chart after nine weeks to later re-enter it in late April due to the re-release of the album, the Love Love Love Edition, and peaked at twelve. After staying on the chart for another six weeks it left it for good with a total of fifteen weeks. In France it entered and peaked the French Albums Chart on 12 September 2009 at thirty-eight and stayed on the chart for a total of twenty-nine weeks leaving on 24 April 2009. As in Sweden, a re-release of the album was made called the "Edition Collector". The first version of the album stayed on the chart for fifteen weeks and the latter stayed there for fourteen weeks peaking at forty-seven. The album later received a Silver certification in France where 30,000 albums were sold.

In Germany the album peaked at sixty-eight with sales of 20,000 copies, and in Austria and Switzerland it peaked at seventy and forty-five. In Poland it peaked at fourteen and in the United Kingdom it peaked at 112 on the official charts and peaked at 13 on the dance albums chart.

Singles
"Release Me", was the last song to be recorded for Dance Love Pop since the record company felt that the album would need another track. It was chosen as the lead single internationally, except from Sweden and the Netherlands where "On and On" was the lead single. It became the album's best-selling and most popular single, and peaked at number one in the Billboard Hot Dance Club Play. The song also peaked high on the charts all over Europe, such as number 3 the UK Singles Chart selling almost 400,000 copies, and 7 in the French Singles Chart. The single sold "Gold" in Australia, Denmark, Sweden, Germany and Italy; "Silver" in the United Kingdom and "Platinum" in Norway.

The second international single, "On and On", was released as the follow-up to "Release Me" with massive expectations. The song managed to chart in the French and Swiss Singles Charts even before its release, in digital sales from the album only. It did also chart in Sweden, Denmark and Belgium. In the UK, "On and On" was rejected as the second single though it was meant from the start as Agnes' follow up in the UK and Ireland. The song was later released at the third single in the UK and peaked at #82 in the official charts and #10 on the dance chart. In Sweden, this was the single that announced Agnes comeback and forthcoming album.

The third single from the album was "Love Love Love" and was only released in Sweden. The song was Agnes' entrant in Sweden's Eurovision Song Contest selection process Melodifestivalen. After proceeding to the final from the fourth semi-final, the song placed eighth out of the eleven entries. "Love Love Love" is written by Anders Hansson and was released as a one track CD single by Roxy Recordings. It peaked at four on the Swedish Official Single Chart.

"I Need You Now" was the fourth single in Sweden, the third in Belgium, the Netherlands and Italy and the second single in the United Kingdom, Norway and Australia. On the original track listing of Dance Love Pop this song was a ballad, the solution was to re-record it as a dance-music song for the single release. The song failed to match the success of its predecessors and only charted at number 40 in the UK. In Sweden it peaked at eight, in Slovakia at fifteen, in Belgium at twenty (Flanders) and two (Wallonia) and in Ukraine at one.

The album's fifth single was "Sometimes I Forget", it was released in France as the third single in mid-2010 and in Italy as the fourth single.

Critical reception

Sandra Wall from Norrköpings Tidningar writes "she makes an album that fits the dance floor at any club. A mood trigger with bubbling enjoyment." and "Agnes has been keeping great standard since she won Idol, but now when she's increased the tempo, it becomes really great. The lyrics is about messy relationships and aren't that deep. Which fits perfectly on the dance floor."

"Don't let you be fooled by the childish cover, it's  passably fallacious" says Anneli Wikström in Metro, she also writes that the album is "far from bubblegum and children's party" and says that it's unexpectedly mature and an eye wink with the 80's. Lisa Appelqvist from Kristianstadsbladet compares Agnes to Madonna and Whitney Houston. She says "With her reincarnated voice from the divas of the 70's she burst out "Release Me". Hansson's craft work almost breaths Madonna's "Like a prayer" with gospel/cello and Agnes haplessly frustrated pray." She continues with "Only 21 years old and I have a feeling that Agnes has a lot to offer us in the future. [...] Agnes Carlsson once and for all gets rid of the "Idol"-dust." Göteborgsposten's Johan Rylander says that the cooperation with Anders Hansson is "the improvement Agnes aspired for since she won Idol 2005. The bombastic Celine-ballads are gone and modern dance-pop of great quality (like Release me) have replaced it."

Track listing

Standard Editions

Deluxe / Limited Editions

Bonus Tracks

Personnel
Vocals: Agnes Carlsson
Executive Producer: Anders Hansson
Producers: Anders Hansson, Felix Persson, Marta Grauers
Mixer: Ronny Lahti
Mastered by: Erik Broheden
Keyboards: Anders Hansson, Felix Persson, Marta Grauers
Strings: Erik Arvinder, Anders Hansson, Erik Arvinder
Violin: Erik Arvinder, Josef Cabrales-Alin, Andreas Forsman, Anders Hjortvall, Anna Larsson, Daniel Migdal, Andrej Power, Aleksander Satterstrom, Fredrik Syberg
Viola: Olof Ander, Erik Holm, Anders Noren, Christopher Ohman
Cello: Gudmund Ingvall, Cecilia Linne, Henrik Soderquist, Erik Wahlgren
Doublebass: Danijel Petrovic
Guitar: Staffan Astner, Anders Hansson
Backing Vocals: Agnes Carlsson, Britta Bergstrom, Jeanette Olsson, Martin Rolinski, Anders Hansson
Album covers design: Ricky Tillblad/Zion Graphics
Album Photography: Waldemar Hansson
Album Photography [UK & Dutch Release]: Linda Alfvegren

Charts

Weekly charts

Year-end charts

Release history

References

External links
Official Website
Official U.S. Website
Official German Website

2008 albums
Dance music albums by Swedish artists
Agnes (singer) albums